A Matter of Dignity (translit. To teleftaio psema) is a 1958 Greek drama film directed by Michael Cacoyannis. It was entered into the 1958 Cannes Film Festival.

Plot
The Pellas are magnates who face financial ruin.  Desperate to conceal the dire straits they are in and maintain their social status, they plan to marry their beautiful daughter Chloe off to a wealthy, dull middle-aged man. Caught between caring for her family and her doomed love for her young but poor boyfriend, Chloe flees to her retired nanny.

Cast
 Ellie Lambeti as Chloe Pella
 Athena Michailidou as Roxanni Pella
 Eleni Zafeiriou as Katerina
 Giorgos Pappas as Kleon Pellas (as Georgios Pappas)
 Michalis Nikolinakos as Galanos
 Dimitris Papamichael as Markos
 Minas Christidis as Nikos Dritsas
 Vasilis Kailas as Vasilakis (as Vasilakis Kailas)
 Zorz Sarri
 Despo Diamantidou
 Mary Chronopoulou
 Despoina Nikolaidou
 Dimitris Hoptiris
 Dimitra Zeza
 Nikos Fermas
 Nikos Kourkoulos

References

External links

1958 films
1958 drama films
Greek drama films
1950s Greek-language films
Films directed by Michael Cacoyannis
Films scored by Manos Hatzidakis